Louise Timpson (née Louise Hollingsworth Morris Clews, formerly Vanneck; November 27, 1904 – February 10, 1970), previously Louise Campbell, Duchess of Argyll, was an American socialite and, later, a British aristocrat. She was the second wife of Ian Douglas Campbell, 11th Duke of Argyll and the mother of the 12th Duke.

Early life
She was the daughter of the American-born artist Henry Clews Jr. (1876–1937), and his first wife, the New York socialite Louise Hollingsworth (née Morris) Gebhard (1877–1936). Before her parents' 1901 marriage, her mother had been married to Frederick Gebhard.

Her paternal grandparents were Henry Clews, an English-born Wall Street investment banker, and Lucy Madison (née Worthington) Clews, who was related to U.S. President James Madison. Her maternal grandparents were John Boucher Morris and Louise Kittera (née Van Dyke) Morris.

Personal life

First marriage

On September 1, 1930, Louise was married to the Hon. Andrew Nicholas Armstrong Vanneck (1890–1965), son of the Hon. William Arcedeckne Vanneck, and his wife, the former Mary Armstrong.  Andrew was the younger brother of William Vanneck, 5th Baron Huntingfield, who was the 17th Governor of Victoria. Their married home was at Heveningham Hall. They had no children, and were divorced in 1933.

Second marriage
Two years after her divorce from Vanneck, she married Captain Ian Campbell (1903–1973) on November 23, 1935.  Campbell's first marriage, to Janet Gladys Aitken (daughter of Max Aitken, 1st Baron Beaverbrook), had ended in divorce in 1934. There was one daughter from Campbell's marriage to Aitken, Lady Jeanne Campbell (1928–2007), who was brought up mainly by her father when her mother returned to Canada without her. Lady Jeanne later married the American writer Norman Mailer in 1962; they divorced shortly thereafter in 1963. Together, Louise and Ian were the parents of two sons:

 Ian Campbell, 12th Duke of Argyll (1937–2001), who married Iona Colquhoun, daughter of Sir Ivar Colquhoun, 8th Baronet, and had two children.
 Lord Colin Ivar Campbell (born 1946), who married Georgia Arianna Ziadie, a Jamaican-born British writer.

During the Second World War, Campbell was in the armed forces and spent some time as a prisoner of war. His wife crossed the Pyrenees to Lisbon, where she helped with relief efforts. Among other things, she arranged for beer and Christmas puddings to be received at the POW camps.

Campbell inherited his cousin's dukedom in 1949, making his wife Duchess of Argyll, but they were divorced in 1951. The duke was a notorious spendthrift, and, when asked, Louise is said to have replied "He took everything but my trust funds." The duchess filed for divorce because of the duke's adultery with the woman who would become his third wife, the notorious Margaret Whigham Sweeny.

Third marriage
She relocated to the United States following her divorce, and her third marriage was to Robert Clermont Livingston Timpson (1908–1988), an American investment banker, in 1954.  Timpson was the grandson of John Henry Livingston of the prominent Livingston family. They moved into Grasmere, a mansion in Rhinebeck, which she later opened to the public.

They divorced in 1963, and the former duchess died in New York in 1970, aged 65.

Descendants
Through her eldest son, she was the grandmother of Torquhil Campbell, 13th Duke of Argyll (born 1968) and Lady Louise Iona Campbell (born 1972), who married Anthony Burrell and had children.

References

External links

1904 births
1970 deaths
American expatriates in France
American socialites
Louise
Louise
Louise
Louise